This is a list of geographical features in the state of Baden-Württemberg, Germany.

Mountains 

 Black Forest (including Feldberg)
 Odenwald
 Spessart
 Swabian Alb

Rivers 

 Danube
 Iller
 Main
 Neckar
 Rhine
 Tauber

Lakes 

 Lake Constance

Miscellaneous 

 Aachtopf
 Mainau

Cities 

see List of cities in Germany

Geography of Baden-Württemberg
Baden-Württemberg-related lists
Baden-Württemberg